Iron Chef Showdown is an American cooking show based on Fuji Television's Iron Chef, and is the fourth American adaptation of the series, following Iron Chef USA and Iron Chef America and Iron Chef Gauntlet.  The show is produced by Food Network, which also carried a dubbed version of the original Iron Chef.  Like the original Japanese program, the program is considered to be a culinary game show. In each episode, two new challenger chefs first compete against one another with the winner competing against one of the resident "Iron Chefs" in a one-hour cooking competition based on a secret ingredient or ingredients, and sometimes theme.

The show is presented as a re-imagined take on Iron Chef America. The Chairman is once again portrayed by actor and martial artist Mark Dacascos, who was introduced as the nephew of the original Japanese chairman Takeshi Kaga on Iron Chef America.  The commentary is provided by Alton Brown who also serves as the host as well as a judge, and a new floor reporter Jaymee Sire is introduced.

The series premiered on Food Network on November 8, 2017 with a Thanksgiving-themed episode, with ten episodes aired in the first season. Iron Chefs Bobby Flay, Jose Garces, Alex Guarnaschelli, and Michael Symon return for this series; they are joined by the newest Iron Chef, Iron Chef Gauntlet winner Stephanie Izard. During taping of the first season, Bobby Flay removed his chef's coat to reveal a T-shirt which read "This is my last Iron Chef battle ever"; he later confirmed that he has officially quit the Iron Chef franchise.

Format 
Two challengers enter Kitchen Stadium and battle one another in a Chairman's Challenge based upon a secret ingredient. Alton Brown is the sole judge of this challenge and decides which of the two challengers advance to the next stage. The winner then faces an Iron Chef in a Secret Ingredient Showdown,  in the traditional Iron Chef and Iron Chef America format. A panel of two guest judges decide the winner. Unlike the original Iron Chef America, the Chairman does not dine with the judges; host Alton Brown takes his place at the judging table, but does not vote on the winner.  The two parts of the show, the Chairman's Challenge and the Secret Ingredient Showdown were introduced in Iron Chef Gauntlet.

The Iron Chefs

Iron Chef statistics

The win/loss data is based solely on the performance of the participant as an Iron Chef in Iron Chef Showdown and does not include win–loss records on any previous programs including Iron Chef, Iron Chef America, The Next Iron Chef, or Iron Chef Gauntlet.

Episodes

Companion shows

Iron Chef: Outside the Stadium 
Prior to the premiere episode of Showdown, Food Network aired a one-time special, Iron Chef: Outside the Stadium, which reviewed current status of former and current Iron Chefs Bobby Flay, Alex Guarnaschelli, Geoffrey Zakarian, Stephanie Izard, Michael Symon, Jose Garces and Wolfgang Puck.

Iron Chef: Behind the Battle 
After each episode of Showdown, Food Network will air an episode of the companion series Iron Chef: Behind the Battle. In this series, Alton Brown will revisit some of the fan-favorite battles of the past from Iron Chef America and provide his unique perspective and in-depth look at these battles.

References

2017 American television series debuts
2010s American cooking television series
American television series based on Japanese television series
Food Network original programming
Showdown
American television spin-offs
Cooking competitions in the United States